Gunnar Erling Nilsson (1922–1997) was a Swedish trade union organiser. Originally a glass-blower by profession, he belonged to the Swedish Wood Industry Workers' Union. Nilsson was the chairman of the Swedish Trade Union Confederation 1973–1983.

References

Swedish trade unionists
1922 births
1997 deaths
People from Kalmar County